Ban-Lon (sometimes spelled BanLon or Banlon) is a trademarked, multistrand, continuous-filament synthetic yarn used in the retail clothing industry. It was created in 1954 by Joseph Bancroft & Sons Company, by applying a process for crimping yarn to nylon in order to achieve greater bulk than ordinary yarns. It became popular for outerwear, swimsuits, sweaters and  hose. It is frequently associated with 1950s and 1960s American clothing and culture. 

Ban-Lon came to be used as a punchline for jokes in films and on television shows in the 1990s. In an episode of NBC's Seinfeld series, Frank Costanza said that because of his "man breasts" he "wouldn't be caught dead in Ban-Lon", when Sid Farkus claims he wears it and there appears to be "some jiggling". Also, in the film Romy and Michele's High School Reunion, Michelle comments, "...how am I gonna impress anybody by selling Ban-Lon smocks at Bargain Mart?"

See also 
 Polyester
 Rayon

References 

Synthetic fibers
Woven fabrics
Technical fabrics